Following is a list of Michigan writers, who are noteworthy either by having been born in Michigan or by living there during their writing career.

Children's books 
 Verna Aardema, author of ethnic-themed works (Ashanti, Zanzibari, Akamba and Ayutla Mexican sources), winner of Caldecott Medal (born in New Era)
 Chris Van Allsburg, author of The Polar Express, twice winner of Caldecott Medal (born in East Grand Rapids)
 Marguerite de Angeli, writer and illustrator, won 1950 Newbery Award, one of first inductees of Michigan Women's Hall in of Fame (born in Lapeer)
 K. A. Applegate, children's and young adult author (born in Ann Arbor)
 Mark Crilley, manga creator, children's book author/illustrator; creator of Miki Falls, Akiko, Brody's Ghost, and POP! Goes the Weasel (born in Detroit)
 Christopher Paul Curtis, author, won Newbery Medal and Coretta Scott King award (born in Flint)
 Meindert DeJong, received 1962 Hans Christian Andersen Award, awarded Newbery Medal and National Book Award (resided in Grand Rapids, attended Calvin College)
 Aileen Fisher (1906–2002), author (born in Iron River)
 Margaret Hillert, poet and author of children's literature (born in Saginaw, taught in Royal Oak School District)
 Laurie Keller, writer and illustrator (born in Muskegon)
 Patricia Polacco, author (Union City)
 Robert Sabuda, pop-up book artist and paper engineer (born in Pinckney)
 Gary Schmidt, author of children's literature and young adult fiction (college professor in Grand Rapids)
 Jon Scieszka, author (born in Flint)
 Devin Scillian, author (broadcaster in Detroit)
 Philip C. Stead, author (born in Farmington Hills)
 Gloria Whelan, author born in Detroit, winner of National Book Award for Young People's Literature for 2000
 Christopher Wright, author of American Chillers and Michigan Chillers (born in Pontiac, Michigan)

Fiction 
 Nelson Algren, novelist (born in Detroit)
 John Edward Ames, western writer (born in Monroe County)
 Harriette Simpson Arnow, novelist (resided in Ann Arbor)
 Robert Asprin, science-fiction and fantasy writer (born in St. Johns)
 Mathis Bailey, novelist and fiction writer
 Deb Baker, author (born in Escanaba)
 Emma Pow Bauder, novelist (born in North Adams)
 Rex Beach, novelist (born in Atwood)
 John Bellairs, mystery novelist (born in Marshall)
 Mary K. Buck, author (lived and died in Traverse City)
 Bonnie Jo Campbell, author (born in Kalamazoo)
 Jaqueline Carey, fantasy author (resides in Michigan)
 James Oliver Curwood, novelist and conservationist (born in Owosso)
 Loren D. Estleman, crime fiction author (born in Ann Arbor; graduate of Eastern Michigan University)
 Jeffrey Eugenides, novelist (born in Detroit)
 Edna Ferber, novelist (born in Kalamazoo)
 Alice Fulton, short-story writer (born in Troy, New York; moved to Ypsilanti)
 J. Gabriel Gates, young adult and science-fiction writer (raised in Michigan)
 Donald Goines, novelist (born in Detroit)
 Jaimy Gordon, novelist (born in Baltimore, taught at Western Michigan University, lives in Kalamazoo)
 Charlotte E. Gray, novelist and religious writer (born in Reading)
 Judith Guest, novelist and screenwriter (born in Detroit)
 Aaron Hamburger, short-story writer and novelist (born in Detroit)
 Steve Hamilton, mystery and thriller novelist (born in Detroit)
 Jim Harrison, novelist, poet, screenwriter (born in Grayling, attended Michigan State University)
 Jim C. Hines, fantasy novelist and short-story writer (attended Michigan State and Eastern Michigan)
 Joan Carol Holly, science fiction novelist, graduate of Michigan State University 
 James Hynes, author (born in Okemos)
 Alex Irvine, novelist and short-story writer (born in Ann Arbor, raised in Ypsilanti)
 Jerry B. Jenkins, novelist, author of Left Behind series (born in Kalamazoo)
 Janet Kauffman, novelist (born in Lancaster, Pennsylvania; moved to Hudson)
 Clarence Budington Kelland, short-story writer and novelist (born in Portland)
 William X. Kienzle, Catholic priest, mystery author (born in Detroit, resided in Grand Rapids)
 Brad Leithauser, poet, novelist, essayist (born in Detroit)
 Elmore Leonard, novelist and screenwriter (raised in Detroit, resided in Bloomfield Hills)
 Thomas Ligotti, reclusive writer of fiction and poetry (born and raised in Detroit)
 Thomas McGuane, novelist and screenwriter (born in Wyandotte)
 Terry McMillan, author (born in Port Huron)
 Ander Monson, poet, essayist, novelist (born in Houghton)
 Joyce Carol Oates, novelist, winner of National Book Award (born in Lockport, New York, lived in metro Detroit and Windsor, Ontario)
 Alice Randall, author (born in Detroit)
 Lev Raphael, crime fiction author and author across genres (born in New York City)
 Marcus Sakey, crime novelist (born in Flint)
 K.J. Stevens, novelist and short-story writer (born in Alpena)
 Glendon Swarthout, novelist and short-story writer, winner of the O. Henry Prize (born in Pinckney)
 John D. Voelker, novelist who wrote Anatomy of a Murder under pen name Robert Traver (born in Ishpeming)
 Maritta Wolff, novelist (born in Grass Lake)
 Michael Zadoorian, novelist and short-story writer (born in Detroit)

Journalists and nonfiction 
 Bruce Ableson, inventor of Open Diary (born in West Bloomfield)
 Mitch Albom, author, sportswriter, radio talk show host (born in Trenton, New Jersey; lives in metro Detroit)
 Ruth Alice Armstrong, non-fiction writer (born in Cassopolis)
 Ella H. Brockway Avann, religious writer (born in Newaygo)
 Catharine H. T. Avery, editor of The American Monthly, the official organ of the Daughters of the American Revolution (born in Dundee)
 Lepha Eliza Bailey, non-fiction writer (born in Battle Creek)
 Joel Bakan, legal writer and Canadian lawyer (born in Lansing)
 Ray Stannard Baker, 19th-century muckraking journalist (born in Lansing)
 Michael Barone, journalist, pundit, editor (born in Highland Park)
 M. E. C. Bates, writer, journalist, and newspaper editor
 Octavia Williams Bates, suffragist, clubwoman, writer (born in Detroit)	
 Jim Bellows, newspaper editor in Washington, New York and Los Angeles (born in Detroit)
 Emma E. Bower, newspaper owner, publisher, and editor; physician (born and died in Ann Arbor)
 Robert K. Brown, war correspondent, founder of Soldier of Fortune magazine (born in Monroe)
 Martha A. Boughton, biographer, poet, songwriter (born in Corunna)
 Amanda Carpenter, author, former correspondent (born in Montrose)
 E. Jean Carroll, magazine writer and advice columnist (born in Detroit)
 Jill Carroll, journalist, Iraqi terrorists' kidnap victim (born in Ann Arbor)
 Bruce Catton, Pulitzer Prize-winning historian (born in Petoskey)
 Zev Chafets, journalist and columnist (born in Pontiac)
 Jonathan Chait, senior editor and columnist (grew up in metro Detroit)
 David Chardavoyne, legal writer (born in Ohio, moved to metro Detroit)
 Lydia J. Newcomb Comings, non-fiction writer (born in Spring Lake)
 Arthur Danto, art critic for The Nation (born in Ann Arbor)
 Paul de Kruif, science writer and microbiologist (born in Zeeland)
 Rachael Denhollander, author, lawyer, advocate (born in Kalamazoo)
 James Deren, literary nonfiction writer (born in Detroit (resides in White Lake)
 Joe Falls, sportswriter for Detroit newspapers 1956–2004 (born in New York, moved to Detroit)
 M. F. K. Fisher, food writer (born in Albion)
 Terry Foster, sportswriter and radio personality (born in Detroit)
 Ron Fournier, national political journalist (born in Detroit)
 Jennifer Eaton Gökmen, literary nonfiction writer (born in Wayne, raised in West Bloomfield, in 1994 moved to Istanbul, Turkey)
 Lou Gordon, radio and TV commentator, talk show host, columnist, political reporter (born and based in Detroit)
 Jerry Green, sportswriter for Detroit newspapers 1963–2004
 John Grogan, columnist and author (born in Detroit)
 Ben Hamper, journalist and non-fiction writer (born in Flint)
 Jemele Hill, sports commentator and columnist for ESPN (born in Detroit)
 Martha Waldron Janes, minister, reformer, columnist (born in Northfield Township; died in Muskegon)
 Michael Kinsley, editor, columnist (born in Detroit)
 Charlie LeDuff, journalist, author (born in Virginia, grew up in Westland)
 Karl Ludvigsen, editor of Car and Driver, Motor Trend (born in [Kalamazoo)
 Betty Mahmoody, author (born in Alma, Michigan)
 Lucy A. Mallory, magazine publisher, editor (born in Michigan)
 William McPherson, author and Pulitzer Prize-winning journalist (born in Sault Ste. Marie)
 John J. Miller, national political reporter (born in Detroit)
 Elvis Mitchell, film critic (born in Detroit)
 Michael Moore, documentary filmmaker and nonfiction writer (born in Flint)
 Jay Nordlinger, senior editor (born in Ann Arbor)
 Isabel Paterson, author, co-founder of libertarianism (born on Manitoulin Island, Canada; grew up on a rural Upper Peninsula ranch)
 Pauline Periwinkle, journalist, columnist, poet (born in Battle Creek)
 Neal Rubin, columnist, writer of comic strip Gil Thorp (born in California, lives in Farmington Hills)
 Tom Stanton, author of the New York Times bestseller "Terror in the City of Champions" and other non-fiction books (born in Warren)
 Joseph Sobran, paleo-conservative syndicated columnist (raised in Ypsilanti)
 Jennie O. Starkey, first woman in Detroit to adopt journalism as a profession (born and died in Detroit)
 Louise Reed Stowell, scientist, non-fiction writer (born in Grand Blanc)
 Helen Thomas, journalist, White House correspondent (born in Winchester, Kentucky; moved to Detroit)
 Heather Ann Thompson, winner of 2017 Pulitzer Prize for History (born in Detroit)
 Paul Vachon, freelance journalist and local historian (born in Detroit in 1959)
 Bob Wojnowski, sports columnist and radio personality (born in Buffalo, New York, lives in metro Detroit)

Playwrights and screenwriters 
 Ron Allen, playwright (born in Detroit)
 Mike Binder, actor, director, screenwriter (born in Detroit, raised in Birmingham)
 Bruce Campbell, actor and autobiographer (born in Royal Oak)
 Jim Cash, screenwriter(born in Boyne City, lived in Grand Rapids)
 Francis Ford Coppola, screenwriter, director (born in Detroit)
 Pete Dexter, novelist, screenwriter (born in Pontiac)
 Gerald Di Pego, screenwriter (born in Flint)
 Jack Epps, Jr., screenwriter (attended Michigan State)
 Jim Harrison, novelist, screenwriter (attended Michigan State)
 Alice Emma Ives, dramatist, journalist (born in Detroit)
 Jake Kasdan, screenwriter, director (born in Detroit)
 Lawrence Kasdan, screenwriter, director (attended University of Michigan)
 Neil LaBute, playwright, director, screenwriter (born in Detroit)
 Elmore Leonard, novelist, screenwriter (lived in Bloomfield Hills)
 Thomas McGuane, novelist, screenwriter (attended Michigan State)
 Arthur Miller, playwright (attended University of Michigan)
 Ron Milner, playwright (born in Detroit)
 Jane Murfin, playwright, screenwriter (born in Quincy)
 Heather Raffo, playwright, actress (raised in Michigan)
 Ivan Raimi, screenwriter (born in Royal Oak)
 Sam Raimi, screenwriter, director, producer (born in Royal Oak)
 Terry Rossio, screenwriter, producer (born in Kalamazoo)
 Leonard Schrader, screenwriter (born in Grand Rapids)
 Paul Schrader, screenwriter, director (born in Grand Rapids)
 Sandra Seaton, playwright, librettist (lives in Michigan)
 Donald E. Stewart, screenwriter (born in Detroit)

Poets 
 Clara Doty Bates, poet, children's writer (born in Ann Arbor)
 John Malcolm Brinnin, poet (born in Halifax Nova Scotia; raised in Detroit)
 Eudora Bumstead, poet, hymnwriter (born in Bedford Charter Township)
 Jim Daniels, poet (born in Detroit)
 Toi Derricotte, poet (born in Hamtramck)
 Dorothy Donnelly, poet and prose writer (born in Detroit, raised in Grosse Pointe Park, resided in Ann Arbor)
 Myra Douglas, poet, short story writer (born in Adrian)
 Stuart Dybek, poet (born in Chicago; lives in Kalamazoo)
 Max Ellison, poet (lived in Bellaire)
 Clayton Eshleman, poet (born in Indianapolis, moved to Ypsilanti)
 Carolyn Forché, poet (born in Detroit)
 Robert Frost, poet (born in San Francisco, resided and taught in Ann Arbor) 
 Alice Fulton, MacArthur "Genius Award" poet (born in Troy, New York; moved to Ypsilanti)
 Edgar Guest, poet (born in Birmingham, England; moved to Detroit)
 Jim Harrison, poet and novelist (born in Grayling)
 Robert Hayden, poet (born in Detroit; moved to Ann Arbor)
 Conrad Hilberry, poet (born in Ferndale; moved to Kalamazoo)
 Lawrence Joseph, poet (born in Detroit)
 Ruth Ward Kahn, poet, non-fiction writer (born in Jackson, Michigan; attended University of Michigan)
 Jane Kenyon, poet (born in Ann Arbor)
 Mary Torrans Lathrap, poet (born and died in Jackson)
 Margaret Wynne Lawless, poet, non-fiction writer (born in Adrian)
 Philip Levine, poet (born in Detroit)
 Thomas Lynch, poet (born in Detroit)
 Naomi Long Madgett, poet (born in Norfolk, Virginia, raised in East Orange, New Jersey, moved to Detroit and Ypsilanti)
 Douglas Malloch, poet (born in Muskegon), known as the Lumberman's Poet
 Angel Nafis, poet, graduated from Huron High School
 John Frederick Nims, poet (born in Muskegon)
 Marge Piercy, poet and novelist (born in Detroit)
 Dudley Randall, poet, Broadside Press founder (born in Detroit)
 Theodore Roethke, Pulitzer Prize and National Book Award-winning poet (born in Saginaw)
 Carol Smallwood, poet (born in Cheboygan)
 Richard Tillinghast, poet (born in Memphis, resides in Ann Arbor)
 Mary Frances Tucker, poet (born in York Township)	
 Nancy Willard, poet, novelist, children's writer and literary critic (born in Ann Arbor)

Others 
 Wayne Dyer, self-help book writer (born in Detroit)
 James Finn Garner, humorist (born in Dearborn)
 Jerry B. Jenkins, religious writer, "as told to" biographer, romance writer (born in Kalamazoo)
 Ring Lardner, Sr., satirist, short story writer and sports columnist (born in Niles)
 Robert McKee, well-known creative writing instructor (born in Detroit)
 Peter McWilliams, writer and cannabis legalization advocate (born in Detroit)
 Stewart Edward White, writer (born in Grand Rapids)

See also
 List of people from Michigan

References and further reading

 
 

Lists of writers
Writers